William Finnegan was a member of the Wisconsin State Assembly during the 1903 session. Finnegan was a Republican. He was a native of Green Bay, Wisconsin.

References

Politicians from Green Bay, Wisconsin
Republican Party members of the Wisconsin State Assembly
Year of birth missing
Year of death missing